The women's volleyball tournament at the 2017 Southeast Asian Games was held in Kuala Lumpur, Malaysia at the Malaysia International Trade & Exhibition Centre.

Draw

Participating nations

Source: Volleyverse

Results
All times are Malaysia Standard Time (UTC+8)

Preliminary round

Group A

Group B

Final round

Semifinals

Bronze medal match

Gold medal match

Final standings

See also
Men's tournament

References

Women
South